The Philip Marcellin Grounds are a soccer venue in St. Lucia. It has a capacity of 1,000.

In April 2015, it was announced as the venue for the 2015 Windward Islands Tournament after the Beausejour Stadium became unavailable.

The stadium is named after deceased goalkeeper Philip Marcellin.

References 

Football venues in Saint Lucia
Vieux Fort, Saint Lucia